2,2,4-Trimethylpentane, also known as isooctane or iso-octane, is an organic compound with the formula (CH3)3CCH2CH(CH3)2. It is one of several isomers of octane (C8H18). This particular isomer is the standard 100 point on the octane rating scale (the zero point is n-heptane). It is an important component of gasoline, frequently used in relatively large proportions (around 10%) to increase the knock resistance of fuel.

Strictly speaking, if the standard meaning of ‘iso’ is followed, the name isooctane should be reserved for the isomer 2-methylheptane. However, 2,2,4-trimethylpentane is by far the most important isomer of octane and historically it has been assigned this name.

Production
Isooctane is produced on a massive scale in the petroleum industry by alkylation of isobutene with isobutane. This process is conducted in alkylation units in the presence of acid catalysts.

It can also be produced from isobutylene by dimerization using an Amberlyst catalyst to produce a mixture of iso-octenes.  Hydrogenation of this mixture produces  2,2,4-trimethylpentane.

History
Engine knocking is an unwanted process that can occur during high compression ratios in internal combustion engines. In 1926 Graham Edgar added different amounts of n-heptane and 2,2,4-trimethylpentane to gasoline, and discovered that the knocking stopped when 2,2,4-trimethylpentane was added. This work was the origin of the octane rating scale. Test motors using 2,2,4-trimethylpentane gave a certain performance that was standardized as 100 octane.  The same test motors, run in the same fashion, using heptane, gave a performance which was standardized as 0 octane.  All other compounds and blends of compounds then were graded against these two standards and assigned octane numbers.

Safety
In common with all hydrocarbons, 2,2,4-trimethylpentane is flammable.

See also
 Oil refinery
 Antiknock agents

References

External links

International Chemical Safety Card 0496

Alkanes
Antiknock agents